Thailand competed at the 2011 World Championships in Athletics from August 27 to September 4 in Daegu, South Korea.

Team selection

A team of 8 athletes was
announced to represent the country
in the event.  The team includes Pichet Krungget invited by the IPC for the 400m
T53 (wheelchair) men exhibition event.

The following athlete appeared on the preliminary Entry List, but not on the Official Start List of the specific event, resulting in a total number of 6 competitors:

Results

Men

Women

Heptathlon

References

External links
Official local organising committee website
Official IAAF competition website

Nations at the 2011 World Championships in Athletics
World Championships in Athletics
Thailand at the World Championships in Athletics